Matthew Bolduc (born October 12, 1994) is an American professional soccer player who last played as a midfielder for USL League One club Richmond Kickers.

Career
Bolduc attended The Winchendon School where he was a two-time All New England selection as a junior and senior. During that time he was selected and played for the Region 1 ODP '94 squad.

In 2013, he played college soccer for one year at the University of Massachusetts.

In 2014, he moved on and signed for Mass United of the American Soccer League. Bolduc then signed for the USL club Harrisburg City Islanders on March 17, 2016. On May 17, 2017, Bolduc made his first appearance with the Richmond Kickers, coming on for Sunny Jane in the 80th minute in a 1-0 loss to Christos FC in the 2017 Lamar Hunt U.S. Open Cup.

At the end of the 2022 season, his contract option was declined by the Kickers.

References

External links 
 

1994 births
Living people
American soccer players
Association football midfielders
Mass United players
Penn FC players
People from Dublin, New Hampshire
People from Peterborough, New Hampshire
Richmond Kickers players
Soccer players from New Hampshire
UMass Minutemen soccer players
USL Championship players
USL League One players